Hardy Island Marine Provincial Park is a provincial park located near the southern tip of the Hardy Island in British Columbia, Canada. The park as created by BC Parks on 6 March 1992 to protect local flora and fauna. The park itself becomes a small island during high tide.

Facilities
The park provides a safe anchorage for people recreating in Blind Bay. The park features no developed trails or potable water.

References

Provincial parks of British Columbia
Sunshine Coast Regional District
Year of establishment missing
Marine parks of Canada